Majohe is a Tanzanian administrative ward located in Ilala District, Dar es Salaam Region of Tanzania. According to the 2012 census, the ward has a total population of 81,646.

References 

Ilala District
Wards of Dar es Salaam Region